Patricia is a female given name of Latin origin. Derived from the Latin word patrician, meaning "noble"; it is the feminine form of the masculine given name Patrick. The name Patricia was the second most common female name in the United States according to the 1990 US Census. Another well-known variant of this is "Patrice".

According to the US Social Security Administration records, the use of the name for newborns peaked at #3 from 1937 to 1943 in the United States, after which it dropped in popularity, sliding to #745 in 2016.  From 1928 to 1967, the name was ranked among the top 11 female names.

In Polish, the variant is Patrycja, pronounced . It is also used in Romania, in 2009 being the 43rd most common name for baby girls.

People 
 Patricia of Naples  (died c. 665), Italian Roman Catholic and Eastern Orthodox saint
 Patricia Angadi (1914-2001), British portrait painter and novelist
 Patricia Arquette, American actress and director
 Pat Benatar, American singer
 Patricia Boy, American politician
 Patricia Brake (1942–2022), English actress
 Patricia Briggs, American author
 Pat Cadigan, American author
 Patricia Clarkson, American actress
 Patricia "Tricia" Nixon Cox, daughter of Richard Nixon
 Patricia Hill Collins, American scholar of feminism and gender, author, sociologist, philosopher
 Patricia Cornwell, American author
 Patti Davis, American actress and author
 Patricia Delgado, American ballet dancer
 Pat Dowell, American politician 
 Patty (singer), Japanese–American singer Patricia Fink
 Patricia C. Frist, American businesswoman and philanthropist
 Patricia Gaztañaga (born 1966), Spanish television presenter
 Patricia Gibney, Irish author
 Patrícia Gouveia, Portuguese footballer
 Patricia Grace, Maori writer
 Patricia Gutiérrez, Venezuelan politician
 Patricia Hernández (politician), Canary Island politician
 Patricia Harless, American politician
 Patricia Heaton, American actress, comedian, producer and model
 Patricia Hennin, Canadian multi-sport Paralympic athlete
 Patricia Hewitt, Australian-born British Labour Party politician
 Patricia Highsmith, American novelist
 Patricia Hodge, English actress
 Patricia Joudry (1921 – 2000), Canadian playwright and author.
 Patricia Penn Anne Kemp, Canadian writer better known as Penn Kemp
 Patricia Kalember, American actress
 Patricia Krenwinkel, convicted murderer
 Patricia Kennedy Lawford, American socialite
 Patti LaBelle, American singer, songwriter
 Patricia Lawson (1929–2019), Canadian multi-sport athlete and coach
 Patricia Lemoine (born 1961), French politician
 Patricia Littlechild (born 1965), Scottish sport shooter and neurosurgeon
 Pat Lundvall, American lawyer
 Patricia Madigan, Australian Catholic, interfaith leader, feminist writer
 Patricia Magtanong, Miss International Philippines 2019
 Rooney Mara, American film actress (born Patricia Rooney Mara)
 Patricia Marroquín, Guatemalan public figure and the incumbent First Lady of Guatemala
 Patricia Mayayo (born 1967), Spanish art historian
 Patricia McConnell, American ethologist, author, advice columnist, and radio host
 Pat McDonagh (1934–2014), British fashion designer
 Patricia McKenzie, Canadian actress, dancer and singer
 Patricia A. McKillip (1948–2022), American fantasy and science fiction writer
 Patricia McPherson, American actress
 
 Patricia Mountain, English politician
 Patricia Neal, American actress
 Patricia Newcomb, American producer and publicist
 Pat Nixon, former First Lady of the United States
 Patricia O'Connor, multiple people
 Patricia O'Lynn, Northern Irish politician
 Patricia Owens, Canadian-born American actress
 Patricia Petersen, Australian academic, politician, actress, playwright and director
 Patricia Poleo, Venezuelan journalist
 Pat Phoenix, British actress (born Patricia Phoenix) 
 Patricia Piccinini, Australian artist and sculptor
 Patricia Quinn (disambiguation), multiple people
 Patricia Redlich (1940–2011), Irish clinical psychologist
 Patricia Richardson, American television and film actress
 Patricia Routledge, British actress
 Patricia Rozema (born 1958), Canadian film director, writer and producer
 Patricia Ruanne (1945–2022), British ballerina
 Pat Russell (1923–2021), American community activist and politician
 Patricia Randall Tindale, English architect and civil servant
 Patricia Salas O'Brien (born 1958), Peruvian sociologist and Minister of Education
 Patricia Wettig, American actress and playwright
 Patricia Woodlock (1873 – alive in 1930), British artist and suffragette 
 Patricia Young, Canadian poet
 Princess Patricia of Connaught (1886–1974), member of the British royal family

Fictional characters
 Patricia Dorval, a survivor in the video game Identity V
 Patricia Robertson (comics), Marvel Comics character
 Patricia Walker, Marvel Comics superhero Hellcat
 Patricia, Morgana's human alterego from The Little Mermaid II: Return to the Sea

See also 
 Patricia (genus), a genus of butterflies in the family Nymphalidae
 List of storms named Patricia
 Hurricane Patricia, strongest storm ever recorded in the Western Hemisphere
 Patty (given name)
 Tricia
 Trish
 Trisha

References 

English-language feminine given names